This is a list of nicknames of Major League Baseball teams and players.  It includes a complete list of nicknames of players in the Baseball Hall of Fame, a list of nicknames of current players, nicknames of popular players who have played for each major league team, and lists of nicknames grouped into particular categories (e.g., ethnic nicknames, personality trait nicknames etc.).  It also includes a list of nicknames of current Major League teams.  Sports journalists, broadcasters and fans commonly refer to teams by a wide variety of nicknames.  Many of the names are so established that newspapers routinely use the names in headlines.

Player nicknames

Hall of Fame inductees

Player nicknames by team

Atlanta Braves players nicknames
Hank Aaron, Henry Louis Aaron (1954–1974): "Hammerin' Hank"
Felipe Alou, Felipe Rojas Alou (1958–1974): "Panque"
Dusty Baker, Johnnie B. Baker Jr. (1968–1986): "Dusty"
Steve Bedrosian, Stephen Wayne Bedrosian (1981–1995): "Bedrock"
Bruce Benedict, Bruce Edwin Benedict (1978–89): "Retriever", "Eggs"
Buzz Capra, Lee William Capra (1971–1977): "Buzz"
Rico Carty, Ricardo Adolfo Jacobo Carty (1963–1979): "Big Boy (Beeg Boy)" or "Rico"
Chris Chambliss, Carroll Christopher Chambliss (1971–1988): "Silent One"
Darrell Evans, Darrell Wayne Evans (1969–1989): "Doody," or "Howdy" or "Howdy Doody"
Rafael Furcal, Rafael Antoni Furcal (2000–2014): "El Enano (The Dwarf)"
Ralph Garr, Ralph Allen Garr (1968–1980): "Roadrunner" or "Gator"
Evan Gattis, James Evan Gattis (2013–2018): "El Oso Blanco (The White Bear)" 
Tom Glavine, Thomas Michael Glavine (1987–2008): "The Great Glavine" or "Tommy G"
Eric Hinske: "Hinske, With His Best Shot"
Bob Horner, James Robert Horner (1978–1988): "Mr. Ho Mah"
Andruw Jones, Andruw Rudolf Jones (1996–2012): "The Curaçao Kid"
Chipper Jones, Larry Wayne Jones (1993–2012): "Chipper"
Ryan Klesko, Ryan Anthony Klesko: "Rhino"
Mark Lemke, Mark Alan Lemke (1988–1998): "Dirt" or "The Lemmer"
Greg Maddux, Gregory Alan Maddux (1986–2008): "Mad Dog" or "The Professor"
Rabbit Maranville, Walter James Maranville (1912–1920, 1929–1935): "Rabbit"
Eddie Mathews, Edwin Lee Mathews Jr. (1952–1968): "Eddie Mattress"
Fred McGriff, Frederick Stanley McGriff (1993–1997): "Crime Dog"
Dale Murphy, Dale Bryan Murphy (1976–1993): "Murph" or "All-American Boy"
Phil Niekro, Philip Henry Niekro (1964–1987): "Knucksie"
Rafael Ramírez, Rafael Emilio Ramírez Peguero (1980–1992): "Raffy"
John Smoltz, John Andrew Smoltz (1988–2009): "Smoltzie" or "Marmaduke"
Warren Spahn, Warren Edward Spahn (1942–1965): "The Invincible One"
Joe Torre, Joseph Paul Torre (1960–1977): "El Chino"
Bob Uecker, Robert Uecker (1962–1963): "Uke" or "Mr. Baseball"

Baltimore Orioles players nicknames
Don Baylor: Don Edward Baylor (1970–1975): "Groove"
Mark Belanger: Mark Henry Belanger (1965–1982): "The Blade"
Paul Blair: Paul L. D. Blair (1964–1976): "Motormouth"
Al Bumbry: Alonza Benjamin Bumbry (1972–1984): "The Bee"
Butch Davis: Wallace McArthur Davis (1988–1989): "Butch"
Chris Davis: Christopher Lyn Davis (2008–2020): "Crush"
Jim Gentile: James Edward Gentile (1960–1963): "Diamond Jim"
J. J. Hardy: James Jerry Hardy (2011–2017): "JJ"
Adam Jones (2008–18): "Mr. Thanksgiving" (For his 2021 Japan Series home run in Game 5, played on the said American holiday, with the Orix Buffaloes)
Milt Pappas: Miltiades Stergios Papastergios (1957–1965): "Gimpy"
Barney Pelty: (1903–1912): "The Yiddish Curver"
Boog Powell: John Wesley Powell (1961–1974): "Boog"
Cal Ripken: Calvin Edwin Ripken Jr. (1981–2001):  "Iron Man"
Brooks Robinson: Brooks Calbert Robinson (1955–1977): "Human Vacuum Cleaner"
Frank Robinson: Frank Robinson (1966–1971): "The Judge"
Buck Showalter: William Nathaniel Showalter, III (manager 2010–2018): "Buck"
Hoyt Wilhelm: James Hoyt Wilhelm  (1958–1962): "Old Sarge"

Boston Red Sox players nicknames
Bronson Arroyo (2000–2017): "Saturn Nuts", "Smokey", "Tacks", "Dirty", "BroYo" or "Free Love"
Andrew Benintendi (2016-present): "Benny Biceps'", "Ben Nintendo"
Dennis Ray Boyd (1982-1989): "Oil Can Boyd"
Roger Clemens (1984-1996): "Rocket"
Dom DiMaggio (1940–1953): "The Little Professor"
Nomar Garciaparra (1996–2004): "Nomah" 
Bill Lee (1969–1978)": "Spaceman"
David Ortiz (2003–2016): "Big Papi" 
Dustin Pedroia (2006–2019): "The Laser Show"
Johnny Pesky (1942–1952): "The Needle"
Dick Stuart (1963–1964) "Stonefingers" (or "Stone Fingers") 
Jason Varitek (1997–2011): "Tek" 
Shane Victorino (2013–2015): "Flyin' Hawaiian"
Ted Williams (1939–1960): "The Kid", "The Splendid Splinter", "Teddy Ballgame", "The Tunnel"
Carl Yastrzemski (1961–1983): "Yaz"
Kevin Youkilis (2004–2012): "Youk" or "The Greek God of Walks"

Chicago Cubs players nicknames
Grover Cleveland Alexander: Old Pete
Ernie Banks: Mr. Cub
Mordecai Brown: Three-Finger
Henry Blanco: Hank White
Ron Cey: Penguin
Aroldis Chapman: The Cuban Missile
Andre Dawson: The Hawk
Leon Durham: Bull
Mark Grace: Gracie
Ferguson Jenkins: Fergie
Greg Maddux: Mad Dog
Fred McGriff: Crime Dawg
Rich Gossage: Goose
Dave Kingman: Kong
Kyle Hendricks: The Professor
Gary Matthews: Sarge
Walt Moryn: Moose
Bill Nicholson: Swish
Ryne Sandberg: Ryno
Sammy Sosa: Slammin Sammy
Mitch Williams: Wild Thing
Marvell Wynne: Marvelous
Carlos Zambrano: Big Z
Don Zimmer: Popeye
David Ross: Grandpa Rossy 
Addison Russell: Addison Muscle
Ben Zobrist:  Zorilla
Kris Bryant:  KB K-Boom
Kyle Schwarber:  Schwarbs
Javier Baez:  El Mago (The Magician)
Albert Almora:  Tico
Alex Avila:   Parkman
Jason Heyward:  J-Hey
John Lackey:  Big John
Jose Quintana:  Q
Ian Happ:  Happer
Anthony Rizzo:  Tony

Chicago White Sox players nicknames
Jose Abreu  "El Pito"
Tim Anderson  "TA" 
Luke Appling "Old Aches and Pains"
Ozzie Guillen "The Wizard of Oz"
Billy Hamilton "Billy the Hitter" 
Tadahito Iguchi "The Gooch"
Joe Jackson "Shoeless" or "Say it Ain't So"
Bobby Jenks "Big Bad Bobby"
Paul Konerko "Paulie"
Nick Madrigal "Nicky Two Strikes
Minnie Minoso "Mr. White Sox" or "Cuban Comet"
Scott Podsednik "Scotty Pods"
Alexei Ramirez "Cuban Missile"
Frank Thomas "The Big Hurt"

Cincinnati Reds players nicknames
 Sparky Anderson, George Anderson (manager, 1970–1978): "Sparky"
 Aristides Aquino (2019–present): "The Punisher"
 Bronson Arroyo (2000–2017): "Saturn Nuts", "Smokey", "Tacks", "Dirty", "BroYo" or "Free Love"
Jeff Brantley (1994–1997): "The Cowboy"
Tom Browning (1984–1994) "Mr. Perfect" 
Sean Casey (baseball) (1998–2005): "The Mayor"
Aroldis Chapman (2010–2015): "The Cuban Missile"
Francisco Cordero (2008–2011): "CoCo"
Eric Davis (1984–1991, 1996) "Eric the Red" or "44 Magnum"
Adam Dunn (2001–2008): "Big Donkey"
Todd Frazier (2011–2015): "The Toddfather"
 Cesar Geronimo (1972–1980) "The Chief"
 Ken Griffey Jr. (2000–2008) "Junior"
Ted Kluszewski (1947–1957) "Big Klu"
 Ernie Lombardi (1932–1941) "Schnozz" or "Lumbago"
 Michael Lorenzen (2015–present) "Mikey Biceps", "Cowboy" or "Zen Master"
 Lee May (1965–1971) "The Big Bopper" 
Joe Nuxhall (1944–1966): "Ol' Lefthander"
Tony Perez (1964–1976): "Doggie"
Brandon Phillips (2002–present): "Dat Dude"
 Frank Robinson (1956–1965) "Robby" 
Ron Robinson (1984–1990) "True Creature" 
Pete Rose (1963–1978, 1984–1986): "Charlie Hustle"
Chris Sabo (1988–1993, 1996) "Spuds"
 Tom Seaver (1977–1982) "Tom Terrific"
Joey Votto (1997–Present) "Vottomatic"
David Weathers (1998–2001): "Stormy Weathers"
Dmitri Young (1998–2001): "Da Meathook"

Cleveland Indians players nicknames
Gary Bell:  "Ding" or "Ding Dong"
Albert Belle: "Joey", "Snapper", " "Mr. Freeze",
Lou Boudreau: "Old Shufflefoot" or "Handsome Lou"
Bob Feller: "Rapid Robert", "Bullet Bob", "The Heater from Van Meter"
Mel Harder: "Chief" or "Wimpy"
Mike Hargrove: "The Human Rain Delay" or "Grover"
Jim Hegan: "Shanty"
Willis Hudlin: "Ace" or "Hud"
Rick Manning: "Archie"
Sam McDowell: "Sudden Sam"
Chris Perez: "Pure Rage"
Al Rosen, Albert Leonard Rosen (1947–1956): "Flip"
Harry Simpson: "Suitcase"
Tris Speaker: "The Grey Eagle"
Andre Thornton: "Thunder"
Omar Vizquel: "Little O"or "Hands of Silk"

Colorado Rockies players nicknames
Ellis Burks, Ellis Rena Burks (1987–2004): "E.B."
Brian Fuentes, Brian Christopher Fuentes (2001–2012): "T-Rex", "Tito"
Andrés Galarraga, Andrés Jose Galarraga (1985–2004): "Big Cat" or "Andres The Giant"
Carlos González (baseball), Carlos Eduardo Gonzalez (2008–present) : "CarGo" or "Little Pony"
Todd Helton, Todd Lynn Helton (1997–2013): "T.L." or "The Toddfather"
Steve Reed,  Steven Vincent Reed (1992–2005): "Father Time"
Wilin Rosario, Wilin Arismendy Rosario (2011–2015): "Baby Bull"
Troy Tulowitzki, Troy Trevor Tulowitzki (2006–2015): "Tulo"
Larry Walker, Larry Kenneth Robert Walker (1989–2005): "Booger" or "The Canadian Clubber"
Charlie Blackmon, Charles Cobb Blackmon (2011–present): "Charlie" or "Chuck Nazty"

Detroit Tigers player nicknames

Sparky Anderson, George Lee Anderson (manager, 1979–1995): "Sparky"
Skeeter Barnes, William Henry Barnes (infield, outfield, 1983–1994): "Skeeter"
Miguel Cabrera (2003–present): "Miggy, MC Hammer"
Ty Cobb (1905–1926): "The Georgia Peach"
Mark Fidrych (1976–1980): "The Bird"
Cecil Fielder (1990-1995) "Big Daddy"
Hank Greenberg (1930, 1933–1941, 1945–1946): "Hammerin Hank", the "Hebrew Hammer"
José Iglesias (2013–present): "Iggy"
Aurelio Lopez: (1979–1985): "Señor Smoke"
Charlie Maxwell: (1955–1962): "Paw Paw"
James McCann (2015–present): "McCannon"
Schoolboy Rowe, Lynwood Thomas Rowe (1932–1942): "Schoolboy"
Alan Trammell (1977–1996): "Tram"
Lou Whitaker (1977–1995): "Sweet Lou"
Charlie Gehringer (1924-1942): "The Mechanical Man"
Lance Parrish (1977-1986): "The Big Wheel"
Sam Crawford (1903-1917): "Wahoo Sam"
Paul Trout (1939-1951): "Dizzy"
Norm Cash (1960-1974): "Stormin' Norman"
Mickey Cochrane (1934-1937): "Black Mike"
William Brown (1963-1975): "Gates"

Houston Astros players nicknames
Jeff Bagwell: "Bags",  "Bagpipes"
Lance Berkman: "Big Puma" or "Fat Elvis"
Craig Biggio: "Bidge" or "Killer B"
Enos Cabell: "Big E"
José Cruz: "Cheo"
Carlos Lee: "El Caballo" (The Horse)
Joe Morgan: "Little Joe"
Doug Rader: "The Red Rooster," "Rojo" or "Rooster"
Nolan Ryan: "The Express"
Bob Watson: "Bull"
Jimmy Wynn: "The Toy Cannon"

Kansas City Royals players nicknames
Willie Aikens, Willie Mays Aikens (1977–1985): "Ack Ack"
Kevin Appier, Robert Kevin Appier (1989–2004): "Ape"
Steve Balboni, Stephen Charles Balboni (1981–1993): "Bye Bye" or "Bones"
Buddy Biancalana, Roland Americo Biancalana (1982–1987): "Buddy"
George Brett, George Howard Brett (1973–1993): "Mullet"
Billy Butler, William Raymond Butler Jr. (2007-2014): "Country Breakfast" 
Al Cowens, Alfred Edward Cowens Jr. (1974–1986): "A. C."
Johnny Damon, Johnny David Damon (1995–2012): "The Caveman", "Judas", or "Johnny Cash" (by Red Sox fans)
Tom Gordon, Thomas Gordon (1988–2009): "Flash"
Wally Joyner, Wallace Keith Joyner (1986–2001): " Wally World"
Ed Kirkpatrick, Edgar Leon Kirkpatrick (1962–1977): "Spanky"
Buck Martinez, John Albert Martinez (1969–1986): "Buck"
Roger Nelson, Roger Eugene Nelson (1967–1976): "Spider"
Amos Otis, Amos Joseph Otis (1967–1984): "A.O." or "Famous Amos"
Freddie Patek, Frederick Joseph Patek (1968–1981): "The Flea" or "Moochie"
Marty Pattin, Martin William Pattin (1968–1980): "Bulldog" or "Duck"
Lou Piniella, Louis Victor Piniella (1964–1984): "Sweet Lou", "Big Lou", or "Skipper"
Darrell Porter, Darrell Ray Porter (1971–1987): "Double Barrel Darrell"
Dan Quisenberry, Daniel Raymond Quisenberry (1979–1990): "Quiz" or "Q"
Joe Randa, Joseph Gregory Randa (1995–2006): "The Joker"
Bret Saberhagen, Bret William Saberhagen (1984–2001): "Sabes"
Joakim Soria (2007–present) "The Mexicutioner"
Paul Splittorff (1970–1984) "Splitt"
Kurt Stillwell, Kurt Andrew Stillwell (1986–1996): "Opie"
Jeff Suppan, Jeffrey Scot Suppan (1995–2012): "Soup"
Mac Suzuki, Makoto Suzuki (1996–2002): "Mac"
John Wathan, John David Wathan (1976–85): "Duke"

Los Angeles Angels of Anaheim players nicknames
Shohei Ohtani (2018–present): "Shotime"
Sandy Alomar Sr., Santos (Conde) Alomar Sr. (1964–1978): "Iron Pony"
Garret Anderson, Garret Joseph Anderson (1994– ): "G.A."
Don Baylor, Don Edward Baylor (1970–1988): "Groove" or "The Sneak Thief"
Robert Belinsky (1962–1964): "Bo"
Rod Carew, Rodney Cline Carew (1967–1985): "Sir Rodney"
Chili Davis, Charles Theodore Davis (1981–1999): "Chili" or "Chili Bowl"
Gary DiSarcina, Gary Thomas DiSarcina (1989–2000): "DiSar"
Brian Downing, Brian Jay Downing (1973–1992): "Incredible Hulk"
Wally Joyner, Wallace Keith Joyner (1986–2001): "Wally World"
John Lackey, John Derran Lackey (2002– ): "Bender"
Andy Messersmith, John Alexander Messersmith (1968–1979): "Bluto"
Lance Parrish, Lance Michael Parrish (1977–1995): "Big Wheel"
Troy Percival, Troy Eugene Percival (1995– ): "Percy"
Luis Polonia, Luis Andrew (Almonte) Polonia (1987–2000): "Catch 22" or "Lapa"
Mickey Rivers, John Milton Rivers (1970–1984): "Mick The Quick", "Gozzlehead", or "Mickey Mouth"
Lee Thomas, James Leroy Thomas (1961–1968): "Mad Dog"
Mike Trout, (2011– ): "The Millville Meteor"
Clyde Wright (1966–1975): "Skeeter"

Los Angeles Dodgers players nicknames

 Sandy Koufax, "The Left Arm of God", "Dandy Sandy", "Koo-Foo"
 Roy Campanella, "Campy"
 Ron Cey, "The Penguin"
 Don Drysdale, "Big D"
 Leo Durocher, "The Lip"
 Jim Gilliam, "Junior"
 Orel Hershiser, "Bulldog"
 Frank Howard, "Hondo"
 Lou Johnson, "Sweet Lou"
 Don Newcombe, "Newk"
 Alejandro Peña, "Slow"
 Yasiel Puig, "Wild Horse"
 Phil Regan, "The Vulture"
 Fernando Valenzuela, "El Toro"
 Clayton Kershaw, "Clay", "The Claw", "Kersh"
 Duke Snider, "The Duke", "The Duke of Flatbush", "The Silver Fox"
 John Roseboro, "Rosy", "Gabby"

Milwaukee Brewers players nicknames
Ryan Braun, "Brauny"
Chris Capuano, "Cappuccino"
Scooter Gennett, "Scooty"
Skip Lockwood, Claude Edward Lockwood Jr.: "Skip"
Kirk Nieuwenhuis, "Captain Kirk"
Travis Shaw, "The Mayor of Ding Dong City"

Minnesota Twins players nicknames
Willians Astudillo: "La Tortuga"
Tom Brunansky: "Bruno"
Rod Carew: "Sir Rodney"
Gary Gaetti: "The Rat" or "G-Man"
Jim Grant: "Mudcat"
Kent Hrbek: "Herbie"
Torii Hunter: "Spiderman", "T-Nuts", "Spidey"
Harmon Killebrew: "Killer"
Chuck Knoblauch: "Skippy" or "Knobby"
Tony Oliva: "Tony-O"
Kirby Puckett: "Puck"
Johan Santana: "Jo-Jo" or "Supernatural" or "Cytana"
Zoilo Versalles: "Zorro"
Frank Viola: "Sweet Music"
Byron Buxton : "Byro"
Nelson Cruz : " Nellie" or " boomstick "
Joseph Nathan : "Joe"
Maximilan Rozycki :" Max Kepler"
Jose Berrios :" La Makina"
Josh Donaldson :" The Bringer Of Rain"
Jorge Polanco :" Chulo"

Montreal Expos players nicknames 
 Gary Carter: "The Kid"
 Andre Dawson: "Hawk"
 Andres Galarraga: "The Big Cat"
 Bill Lee: "Spaceman"
 Tim Raines: "Rock"
 Rusty Staub: "Le Grande Orange"

New York Mets players nicknames
 Pete Alonso: "The Polar Bear"
Jeff McNeil: "The Squirrel""The Flying Squirrel"
Francisco Lindor: "Mr. Smile"
Edgardo Alfonzo: "Fonzie"
Wally Backman, Walter Wayne Backman: "Cabbage Patch", "Finster", or "Wally"
Gary Carter, Gary Edmund Carter (1974–92): "The Kid"
Ed Charles: "The Glider"
Choo-Choo Coleman, Clarence Coleman: "Choo-Choo"
David Cone: "Coney"
Duffy Dyer: "Duffy" "Duf"
Lenny Dykstra: "Nails" or "The Dude"
Sid Fernandez: "El Sid"
Dwight Gooden: "Doc" or "Dr. K"
Matt Harvey "The Real Deal" "The Dark Knight of Gotham""The Dark Knight"
Bud Harrelson, Derrel McKinley Harrelson: "Bud" or "Mini-Hawk""Buddy"
Keith Hernandez: "Mex"
Howard Johnson: "HoJo"
Dave Kingman: "Kong", "Sky", "Big Bird" "King Kong", or "Kong Kingman", or "Sky King"
Jerry Koosman, Jerome Martin Koosman: "Kooz" or "Jerry"
Ed Kranepool: "Krane," "The Krane" or "Easy Ed""Steady Eddie"
Dave Magadan: "Mags"
 Steven Matz Iron Matz
Willie Mays: "The Say-Hey Kid"
Lee Mazzilli: "The Italian Stallion" or "Maz"
Kevin McReynolds: "Big Mac"
Félix Millán, Félix Bernardo (Martinez) Millán: "The Cat"
John Milner: "The Hammer"
Mike Pelfrey: "Pelf" or "Big Pelf"
Mike Piazza: "Pizza Man" The Monster
Francisco Rodríguez: Frankie or K-Rod
Nolan Ryan: "The Ryan Express"
Tom Seaver: "Tom Terrific" or "The Franchise"
Rusty Staub, Daniel Joseph Staub: "Rusty" or "Le Grand Orange"
John Stearns: "Bad Dude" or "Dude"
Casey Stengel, Charles Dillon Stengel: "Casey" or "The Old Perfessor"
Darryl Strawberry: "The Straw Man," "Pulled Muscle Face," "Straw, "
Noah Syndergaard: "Thor"
Ron Swoboda: "Rocky"
Marv Throneberry: "Marvelous Marv"
Billy Wagner: "Billy The Kid," "Wags" or "The Sandman"
Mookie Wilson: William Hayward Wilson: " The Mookster" or "Mookie"
 Zack Wheeler:  The Wheel Deal
David Wright: "Captain America"
 Anthony Young: '"A.Y."
 Wilmer Flores Walk off Wilmer

New York Yankees nicknames

Ron Blomberg: "Boomer"
Jim Coates: "The Mummy"
Joe DiMaggio: "Joltin' Joe", "Joe D", "The Yankee Clipper"
Whitey Ford: "The Chairman of the Board"
Frankie Crosetti: "Crow"
Bill Dickey: "The Man Nobody Knows"
Lou Gehrig: "Buster", "The Iron Horse"
Rich Gossage: "Goose"
Ron Guidry: "The Louisiana Lightning", "Gator"
Orlando Hernández: "El Duque"
Reggie Jackson: "Mr. October"
Derek Jeter: "The Captain", "Mr. November","Captain Clutch"
Mickey Mantle: "The Commerce Comet","The Mick"
Didi Gregorius: “Sir Didi”
Hideki Matsui: "Godzilla"
Don Mattingly: "Donnie Baseball"
Thurman Munson: "Tugboat,," "Squatty Body,," "Squatty," "Pudge," or "The Wall"
Graig Nettles: "Puff"
Paul O'Neill: "Paulie", "The Warrior"
Carl Pavano, "American Idle"
Willie Randolph: "Little Willie" or "Mickey"
Phil Rizzuto: "Scooter"
Alex Rodriguez: "A-Rod"
Babe Ruth: "The Babe", "Bambino", "The Sultan of Swat"
Bill Skowron: "Moose"
Roy White: "Mr. Consistent Yankee"
Mariano Rivera:"Mo","Sandman"
Aaron Judge: "The Judge", "All Rise"

Oakland Athletics players nicknames
Sal Bando, Salvatore Leonard Bando (1966–1981): "Captain Sal" or "Sal"
Bert Campaneris, Dagoberto (Blanco) Campaneris (1964–1983): "Campy"
José Canseco, José (Capas) Canseco Jr. (1985–2001): "Parkway Joe" or "The Chemist"
Eric Chavez, Eric César Chávez (1998– ): "Chavy"
Dennis Eckersley: "Eck"
Mike Epstein: "Superjew"
Jason Giambi, Jason Gilbert Giambi: "The Giambino"
Rickey Henderson: "Man of Steal" or "Style Dog"
Catfish Hunter, James Augustus Hunter (1965–1979): "Catfish"
Reggie Jackson, Reginald Martinez Jackson (1967–1987): "Mr. October"
Mark McGwire, Mark David McGwire (1986–2001): "Big Mac" or "Big Red"
Blue Moon Odom, Johnny Lee Odom (1964–76): "Blue Moon"
Dave Parker: "Cobra"
Tony Phillips, Keith Anthony Phillips (1982–1999): "Tony" or "Tony The Tiger" (bestowed by Tigers' announcer Ernie Harwell)
Rubén Sierra: "El Caballo", "El Indio", "Big Rube", or "Ruben Slam-wich"
Dave Stewart, David Keith Stewart (1978–1995): "Smoke"
Miguel Tejada, Miguel Odalis (Martinez) Tejada (1997– ): "The Bus" or "Miggy"
Frank Thomas, Frank Edward Thomas (1990– ): "Big Hurt"
Billy Williams, Billy Leo Williams (1959–1976): "Sweet Swingin' Billy from Whistler"

Philadelphia Phillies players nicknames
Dick Allen, Richard Anthony Allen (1963–1969): "Wampum", "Richie"
Morrie Arnovich, Morris Arnovich (1936–1940): "Snooker" 
Richie Ashburn, Donald Richard Ashburn (1948–1959): "Whitey"
Steve Bedrosian, Stephen Wayne Bedrosian (1986–1989): "Bedrock"
Larry Bowa, Lawrence Robert Bowa (1970-1981): "Gnat"
Kitty Bransfield, William Edward Bransfield (1898–1911): "Kitty"
Pat Burrell, Patrick Brian Burrell (2000–2008): "Pat The Bat", "Patty Baseball"
Putsy Caballero, Ralph Joseph Caballero (1944–1952): "Putsy"
Steve Carlton, Steven Norman Carlton (1972-1986):  "Lefty"
Pearce Chiles, Pearce Nuget Chiles (1899–1900): "What's The Use"
Gavvy Cravath, Clifford Carlton Cravath (1908–1920): "Cactus Gavvy",  "Cactus"
Clay Dalrymple, Clayton Errol Dalrymple (1960–1971): "Dimples"
Darren Daulton Darren Arthur Daulton (1983–1997): "Dutch"
Spud Davis, Virgil Lawrence Davis (1928–1945): "Spud"
Mickey Doolan, Michael Joseph Doolan (1905–1918): "Doc", "Mickey"
Red Dooin, Charles Sebastian Dooin (1902–1916): "Red"
Lenny Dykstra, Leonard Kyle Dykstra (1989–1996): "Nails", "Dude"
Bob Ferguson, Robert Vavasour Ferguson (1871–1884): "Death to Flying Things"
Chick Fraser, Charles Carrolton Fraser (1896–1909): "Chick"
Tom Gordon, Thomas Flynn Gordon (2006-2008):  "Flash"
Roy Halladay,  Harry Leroy Halladay (2010-2013):  "Doc"
Granny Hamner, Granville Wilbur Hamner: "Granny", or "Ham"
Von Hayes, Von Francis Hayes (1981–1992): "Purple Hayes", "Five-for-One", "Old 5–4–1"
Ryan Howard, Ryan James Howard (2004-2016):  "The Big Piece"
Pete Incaviglia, Peter Joseph Incaviglia (1993-1994): "Inky"
Willie Jones, Willie Edward Jones (1947-1959): "Puddin' Head"
Otto Knabe, Franz Otto Knabe (1905–1916): "Dutch"
Brad Lidge, Brad Thomas Lidge (2008-2011):  "Lights out Lidge"
Mike Lieberthal, Michael Scott Lieberthal (1994– ): "Lieby"
Stan Lopata, Stanley Edward Lopata (1948–1960): "Stash"
Greg Luzinski, Gregory Michael Luzinski (1970-1980): "The Bull"
Garry Maddox, Garry Lee Maddox (1975-1986): "The Secretary of Defense"
Gary Matthews, Gary Nathaniel Mathews (1981-1983): "Sarge" 
Jose Mesa, José Ramón Nova Mesa (2001-2003): "Joe Table"
Bake McBride, Arnold Ray McBride (1977-1981): "Bake", "Shake and Bake"
Mickey Morandini, Michael Robert Morandini (1990–2000): "Dandy Little Glove Man"
Sam Nahem (1942, 1948): "Subway Sam"
Dode Paskert, George Henry Paskert: "Dode", "Honey Boy" 
Jimmy Rollins, James Calvin Rollins (2000–2015): "J-Roll", "Wishlist",
Carlos Ruiz, Carlos Joaquín Ruiz (2006-2016):  "Chooch"
Juan Samuel, Juan Milton Samuel (1983–1989): "Sammy"
Curt Schilling, Curtis Montague Schilling (1992-2000): "Schill"
Mike Schmidt, Michael Jack Schmidt (1972-1989) : "Schmiddy", "Iron Mike"
Lonnie Smith, Lonnie Smith (1978-1981): "Skates"
Dick Stuart, Richard Lee Stuart (1965): "Dr. Strangeglove"
John Titus, John Franklin Titus (1903-1912): "Silent John"
Chase Utley, Chase Cameron Utley (2013-2015):  "The Man"
Shane Victorino, Shane Patrick Victorino (2005-2012): "The Flyin' Hawaiian"
Pinky Whitney, Arthur Carter Whitney (1928–1939): "Pinky"
Cy Williams, Fred Williams: "Cy"
Luke Williams (2021): "Captain America"
Mitch Williams (1991–1993): "Wild Thing"
Jimmie Wilson, James Wilson (1923–1940): "Ace"
Vance Worley, Vance Richard Worley (2010-2012):  "Vanimal"
1950 Philadelphia Phillies: "Whiz Kids"
1983 Philadelphia Phillies:  "Wheez Kids"
1993 Philadelphia Phillies:  "Macho Row"

Pittsburgh Pirates players nicknames 
 Pedro Alvarez (2010–2015) "The Big Bull" or "El Toro"
 A. J. Burnett (2012–2013, 2015) "Batman"
 Elroy Face (1953, 1955–1968) "The Bullpen Baron"
 Josh Harrison (2011–2018) "J-Hay"
 Francisco Liriano (2013–2016, 2019) "Frankie"
 Kyle Lobstein (2016) "The Lobster"
 Jeff Locke (2011–2016) "Robin"
 Bill Madlock (1979–1985) "Mad Dog"
 Bill Mazeroski (1956–1972) "Maz"
 Michael McKenry (2011-2013) "The Fort"
 Andrew McCutchen (2009–2017) "Cutch"
 Mark Melancon (2013–2016) "Mark the Shark"
 John Nogowski (2021) "The Big Nogowski"
 Dave Parker (1973–1983) "The Cobra"
 Gregory Polanco (2014–2021) "El Coffee"
 Willie Stargell (1962–1982) "Pops"
 Travis Snider (2012-2014, 2015) "Lunchbox"
 Felipe Vázquez (2016-2019) "Nightmare"
 Honus Wagner (1900-1917) "The Flying Dutchman"
 Lloyd Waner (1927–1941) "Little Poison"
 Paul Waner (1926–1940) "Big Poison"

St. Louis Cardinals players nicknames
Harrison Bader: "Tots"
Daniel Descalso: "Dirty Dan", "Disco Dan"
Tommy Edman: "Tommy Triples"
Jim Edmonds: "Jimmy Ballgame", "Jimmy Baseball"
Jack Flaherty: "JFlare", "Flare"
Dexter Fowler: "Sexy Dexy"
Bob Gibson: "Hoot", "Gibby"
Jim Galloway: "Bad News"
Al Hrabosky: "The Mad Hungarian"
Jason Isringhausen: "Izzy"
Pepper Martin: "Wild Horse of the Osage"
Joe Medwick: "Ducky"
Wilmer Mizell: "Vinegar Bend"
Yadier Molina: "Yadi"
Stan Musial: "Stan the Man"
José Oquendo: "The Secret Weapon"
Albert Pujols: "The Machine"
Ken Reitz: "Zamboni"
Skip Schumaker: "Schu" or "Skip"
Enos Slaughter: "Country"
Ozzie Smith: "The Wizard"
Adam Wainwright: "Waino"

San Diego Padres players nicknames
Andy Benes, Andrew Charles Benes (1989–2002): "Rainman"
Steve Garvey, Steven Patrick Garvey (1969–1987): "Mr. Clean" or "Senator"
Doug Gwosdz, Doug Wayne Gwosdz (1981–1984): "Eyechart"
Tony Gwynn, Anthony Keith Gwynn (1982–2001): "Mr. Padre" and "Captain Video"
Trevor Hoffman, Trevor William Hoffman (1993–2010): "Hoffy"
Terry Kennedy, Terrance Edward Kennedy (1978–1991): "Orville Moody"
Ryan Klesko, Ryan Anthony Klesko (1992–2007): "Rhino"
John Kruk, John Martin Kruk (1986–1995): "Krukker" 
Fred McGriff, Frederick Stanley McGriff (1986– ): "Crime Dog"
Kevin McReynolds, Walter Kevin McReynolds (1983–1994): "Big Mac"
Bip Roberts, Leon Joseph Roberts: "Bip"
Garry Templeton, Garry Lewis Templeton (1976–1991): "Jump Steady"
Dave Winfield, David Mark Winfield (1973–1995): "The Wave" or "Winnie"

San Francisco Giants players nicknames

Harry Danning (1938–1941): "Harry the Horse"
Tim Lincecum (2007-2015): "The Freak"
Sal Maglie (1945–1955): "The Barber"
Christy Mathewson (1900-1916) "Big Six", "The Christian Gentleman", "The Gentleman's Hurler"
Willie Mays (1951–1972): "The Say Hey Kid"
Willie McCovey (1959–1973): "Stretch"
John Montefusco (1974-1980): "The Count"
Buster Posey (2009–present):  "Buster"
Pat Burrell (2010–2011): "Pat The Bat", "Patty Baseball" 
Madison Bumgarner (2009–2019): "Mad Bum"
Orlando Cepeda (1958–1966): "Baby Bull"
Jeffrey Leonard  (1977–1990): "Penitentiary Face", "HacMan", "Hackman"
Will Clark (1986-1993): "Will The Thrill"
Orlando Cepeda (1958-1966): "Peruchin" Baby Bull
Cody Ross (2010-2011) "Ross The Boss"
Pablo Sandoval (2008-2014): "Panda"
Kirk Rueter  (1996-2005) "Woody"
Javier Lopez (2010-2016) "Night Train"
Gregor Blanco (2012-2016,2018) "White Shark"
Brandon Belt (2011–Present) "Baby Giraffe"

Seattle Mariners players nicknames
Alex Rodriguez: "A-Rod"
Jay Buhner: "Bone"
Julio Cruz: "Juice"
Ken Griffey Jr.: "The Kid" and "Junior"
Félix Hernández: "King Felix"
Dave Henderson: "Hendu"
Randy Johnson: "Big Unit"
Edgar Martínez: "Gar" / "Papi"
James Paxton: "Big Maple"
Cal Raleigh: "Big Dumper"
Michael Saunders: "The Condor"
Kyle Seager: "Corey's Brother"
Mike Zunino: "Sasquatch"

Tampa Bay Devil Rays/Rays Player Nicknames
Kevin Kiermaier (2013–present): "The Outlaw"
Brandon Lowe (2018–present): "Dawg" / "Big Dawg" / "Bamm-Bamm"
Mike Zunino (2020–present): "Z" / "Big Z"
Randy Arozarena, Randy Arozarena González (2020–present): "Caballo"
Shane McClanahan (2020–present): "Sugar Shane"
Brett Phillips (2020–present): "Maverick" / "The American Shohei Ohtani""
Wander Franco (2021–present): "El Patrón"
Nelson Cruz (2021): "Boomstick" or Nelly"
Aubrey Huff (2000–2006): "Huff Daddy"
Fred McGriff (1998–2001): "Crime Dog"

Texas Rangers players nicknames
Hanser Alberto, Hanser Joel (Pena) Alberto: "Radio"
Antonio Alfonseca, Antonio Alfonseca: "El Pulpo (The Octopus)"
Elvis Andrus, Elvis Augusto Andrus Torres: "Tiny E"
Len Barker, Leonard Harold Barker: "Large Lenny"
Larvell Blanks, Larvell Blanks: "Sugar Bear"
Hank Blalock, Hank Joe Blalock: "Hank the Tank"
Jerry Browne, Jerome Austin Browne: "The Governor"
Steve Buechele, Steven Bernard Buechele: "Boo"
Will Clark, William Nuschler Clark: "The Thrill"
Francisco Cordero, Francisco Javier Cordero: "Coco""
Nelson Cruz, Nelson Ramon (Martinez) Cruz: "Boomstick" or Nelly"
Danny Darwin, Daniel Wayne Darwin: "Bonham Bullet or Doctor Death"
Chris Davis: Christopher Lyn Davis: "Crush"
Delino DeShields Jr., Delino Diaab DeShields Jr.: "Snacks"
Prince Fielder, Prince Semien Fielder: "Uncle Phil"
Jeff Francoeur, Jeffrey Braden Francoeur: "Frenchy"
Craig Gentry, Craig Alan Gentry: "Kitten Face"
Juan González, Juan Alberto (Vazquez) Gonzalez: "Señor Octubre"
Rusty Greer, Thurman Clyde Greer: "The Red Baron"
Cole Hamels, Colbert Michael Hamels: "Hollywood"
Bill Hands, William Alfred Hands: "Froggy"
Mike Hargrove, Dudley Michael Hargrove: "The Human Rain Delay"
Tom Henke, Thomas Anthony Henke: "Terminator"
Derek Holland, Derek Lane Holland: "The Dutch Oven"
Frank Howard, Frank Oliver Howard: "Hondo" or "The Capital Punisher"
Pete Incaviglia, Peter Joseph Incaviglia: "Inky"
Fergie Jenkins, Ferguson Arthur Jenkins: "Fly"
Jim Kern, James Lester Kern: "Amazing Emu"
Colby Lewis, Colby Preston Lewis: "Cobra"
Nomar Mazara, Nomar Shamir (Jiminian) Mazara: "The Big Chill"
Kevin Mench, Kevin Ford Mench: "Shrek"
Mario Mendoza, Mario (Aizpuru) Mendoza: "Manos de Seda (Satin Hands)"
Dale Mohorcic, Dale Robert Mohorcic: "The Horse"
Rougned Odor, Rougned Roberto Odor: "Stinky" or "Roogie"
Al Oliver, Albert Oliver: "Scoop"
Tom Paciorek, Thomas Marian Paciorek: "Wimpy"
Dave Rajsich, David Christopher Rajsich: "The Blade"
Mickey Rivers, John Milton Rivers: "Mick the Quick"
Iván Rodríguez, Iván Rodríguez Torres: "Pudge"
Kenny Rogers, Kenneth Scott Rogers: "The Gambler"
Robbie Ross Jr., Robert Charles Ross: "The Lawnmower"
Ruben Sierra, Ruben Angel (Garcia) Sierra: "El Caballo"
Don Slaught, Donald Martin Slaught: "Sluggo"
Don Stanhouse, Donald Joseph Stanhouse: "Stan the Man Unusual"
Dave Stewart, David Keith Stewart: "Smoke"
Mickey Tettleton, Mickey Lee Tettleton: "Froot Loops"
César Tovar, César Leonardo Tovar: "Pepito"
Ugueth Urbina, Ugueth Urtain (Villarreal) Urbina: "Oogie"
Mitch Williams, Mitchell Steven Williams: "Wild Thing"

Toronto Blue Jays players nicknames
José Bautista, José Antonio Bautista Santos: "Joey Bats"
Josh Donaldson: "Bringer of Rain"
Kevin Pillar  (2013–2019): "Superman"
David Wells: "Boomer"

Washington Nationals players nicknames

 Mike Epstein, "Super Jew"
 Gio González, "Nat Gio"
 Bryce Harper, "Bam Bam" and "Mondo"
 Max Scherzer, "Mad Max"
 Anthony Rendon, "Lowrider", "Tony", "Ant", "Rendy", "Tone" or "Tony Two Bags"
 Juan Soto, "Childish Bambino"
 Stephen Strasburg, "Soul Crusher"
Ryan Zimmerman, "Mr. National" or "Zim"

Managers, coaches, etc. nicknames
Buck O'Neil, John Jordan "Buck" O'Neil (Negro leagues, Cubs manager): "Nancy"
Antonio María Garcia, El Inglés (The Englishman), Cuban League 1880s

See also 

Nicknames: Sports clubs and their nicknames
 Lists of nicknames – nickname list articles on Wikipedia
 List of athletes by nickname
 List of nicknames in basketball
 List of NFL nicknames

Notes

External links
Gmelch, George, "What's in a Baseball Nickname", NINE: A Journal of Baseball History and Culture Volume 14, Number 2, Spring 2006, pp. 129–132.
Baseball Nicknames: A Dictionary of Origins and Meanings, by James K. Skipper, McFarland & Company, 1992, 
Official Major League Baseball history of American League nicknames
Official Major League Baseball history of National League nicknames
Chris Berman bestowed nicknames (or Bermanisms)
PBS.org – Ken Burns interviews Buck O'Neil

Baseball-related lists
Nicknames
Lists of people with nickname by occupation